Note — many sporting events did not take place because of World War II

1943 in sports describes the year's events in world sport.

American football
 NFL Championship: the Chicago Bears won 41–21 over the Washington Redskins at Wrigley Field
 Notre Dame Fighting Irish – college football national championship
 Angelo Bertelli, Notre Dame quarterback, wins Heisman Trophy.

Association football
 La Liga won by Athletic Bilbao
 Serie A won by Torino
 German football championship won by Dresdner SC
 Primeira Liga won by Benfica
 There is no major football competition in England, Scotland or France due to World War II. In England, several regional leagues are played but statistics from these are not counted in players’ figures.

Australian rules football
 Victorian Football League – Richmond wins the 47th VFL Premiership, defeating Essendon 12.14 (86) to 11.15 (81) in the 1943 VFL Grand Final.

Baseball
 World Series – New York Yankees defeat St. Louis Cardinals, 4 games to 1.
 Negro World Series – Homestead Grays defeat the Birmingham Black Barons, 4 games to  3.

Basketball
NBL Championship

Sheboygan Redskins win two games to one over the Fort Wayne Zollner Pistons

Events
 The eleventh South American Basketball Championship in Lima is won by Argentina.

Cricket
Events
 There is no first-class cricket in England or Australia due to World War II. A few first-class matches are played in the West Indies, South Africa and New Zealand but are not part of any official competition.
India
 Ranji Trophy – Baroda beat Hyderabad by 307 runs.
 Bombay Pentangular – Hindus

Cycling
Tour de France
 not contested due to World War II
Giro d'Italia
 not contested due to World War II

Figure skating
World Figure Skating Championships
 not contested due to World War II

Golf
Men's professional
 Masters Tournament – not played due to World War II
 U.S. Open – not played due to World War II
 British Open – not played due to World War II
 PGA Championship – not played due to World War II
Men's amateur
 British Amateur – not played due to World War II
 U.S. Amateur – not played due to World War II
Women's professional
 Women's Western Open – Patty Berg
 Titleholders Championship – not played due to World War II

Horse racing
Steeplechases
 Cheltenham Gold Cup – not held due to World War II
 Grand National – not held due to World War II
Hurdle races
 Champion Hurdle – not held due to World War II
Flat races
 Australia – Melbourne Cup won by Dark Felt
 Canada – King's Plate won by Paolita
 France – Prix de l'Arc de Triomphe won by Verso II
 Ireland – Irish Derby Stakes won by The Phoenix
 English Triple Crown Races:
 2,000 Guineas Stakes – Kingsway
 The Derby – Straight Deal
 St. Leger Stakes – Herringbone
 United States Triple Crown Races:
 Kentucky Derby – Count Fleet
 Preakness Stakes – Count Fleet
 Belmont Stakes – Count Fleet

Ice hockey
 Stanley Cup – Detroit Red Wings defeat Boston Bruins 4 games to 0.

Motor racing
Events
 No major races are held anywhere worldwide due to World War II

Rowing
The Boat Race
 Oxford and Cambridge Boat Race is not contested due to World War II

Rugby league
1943 New Zealand rugby league season
1943 NSWRFL season
1942–43 Northern Rugby Football League Wartime Emergency League season / 1943–44 Northern Rugby Football League Wartime Emergency League season

Rugby union
 Five Nations Championship series is not contested due to World War II

Speed skating
Speed Skating World Championships
 not contested due to World War II

Tennis
Australia
 Australian Men's Singles Championship – not contested
 Australian Women's Singles Championship – not contested
England
 Wimbledon Men's Singles Championship – not contested
 Wimbledon Women's Singles Championship – not contested
France
 French Men's Singles Championship – Yvon Petra (France) defeats Henri Cochet (France) — score to be ascertained
 French Women's Singles Championship – Simone Iribarne Lafargue (France) † details to be ascertained
USA
 American Men's Singles Championship – Joseph Hunt (USA) defeats Jack Kramer (USA) 6–3, 6–8, 10–8, 6–0
 American Women's Singles Championship – Pauline Betz Addie (USA) defeats Louise Brough Clapp (USA) 6–3, 5–7, 6–3
Davis Cup
 1943 International Lawn Tennis Challenge – not contested

Awards
 Associated Press Male Athlete of the Year: Gunder Hägg, Track and field
 Associated Press Female Athlete of the Year: Patty Berg, LPGA golf

Notes
 Owing to government bans on weekday sport, the Melbourne Cup was run on a Saturday from 1942 to 1944.

 The 1943  Prix de l'Arc de Triomphe  was run at Le Tremblay over 2,300 metres.

References

 
Sports by year